In Greek mythology, Iphimedeia (Ancient Greek: Ἰφιμέδεια) or Iphimede (Ἰφιμέδη) was a Thessalian princess. She was attested in Homer's Odyssey in the Catalogue of women as being a mortal.

Family 
Iphimedia was the daughter of Triopas of Thessaly (a son of Poseidon and Canace) and probably by Hiscilla, daughter of King Myrmidon of Phthia. Her possible brothers were Erysichthon and Phorbas. 

Iphimedea had by Poseidon the twins Otus and Ephialtes who were called the Aloadae after their stepfather. One account called these men's natural father as Aloeus, husband and paternal uncle of Iphimede. The latter mothered as well Pancratis (or Pancrato) to Aloeus. She was probably also the mother of Elate and Platanus, the sisters of the Aloadae.

Mythology

Early years 
Iphimedeia also fell in love with Poseidon, god of the sea, and would often come to the sea shore where she poured the sea water in her lap, until the god came and answered her feelings (cf. the story of Tyro).

Thracian abduction 
Iphimedia's daughter Pancratis was renowned for her beauty. When the two participated in the celebration of the orgies of Dionysus near Drius in Achaea Phthiotis, they were carried off by the companions of the Thracian king Butes and brought to the island of Strongyle (later Naxos) where Pancratis was given in marriage to the new king Agassamenus and Iphimedia to a friend and lieutenant of his. Two other leaders, Sicelus and Hecetorus, had fought over Pancratis and killed each other (or else they were Scellis and Agassamenus themselves). Soon after, Otus and Ephialtes, sent by Aloeus, defeated the Thracians and rescued their mother and sister but Pancratis died not much later.

Connection with Hekate 
Iphimedeia was one of the heroines whose spirits Odysseus encountered at the entrance of the Underworld. 

According to Pietro Scarpi, Iphimedeia should be placed in the chthonic realm as a double of Hekate.

Ancient cults
Her name seems to be attested in Mycenaean Greek in the Linear B syllabic script at Pylos in the form , i-pe-me-de-ja.

Pausanias mentions a painting of Iphimedeia by Polygnotus, and remarks that she was honored by the Carians in Mylasa.

The tomb of Iphimedeia and her sons was shown at Anthedon in Boetia.

Notes

References 

 Apollodorus, The Library with an English Translation by Sir James George Frazer, F.B.A., F.R.S. in 2 Volumes, Cambridge, MA, Harvard University Press; London, William Heinemann Ltd. 1921. ISBN 0-674-99135-4. Online version at the Perseus Digital Library. Greek text available from the same website.
Diodorus Siculus, The Library of History translated by Charles Henry Oldfather. Twelve volumes. Loeb Classical Library. Cambridge, Massachusetts: Harvard University Press; London: William Heinemann, Ltd. 1989. Vol. 3. Books 4.59–8. Online version at Bill Thayer's Web Site
 Diodorus Siculus, Bibliotheca Historica. Vol 1-2. Immanel Bekker. Ludwig Dindorf. Friedrich Vogel. in aedibus B. G. Teubneri. Leipzig. 1888-1890. Greek text available at the Perseus Digital Library.
 Gaius Julius Hyginus, Fabulae from The Myths of Hyginus translated and edited by Mary Grant. University of Kansas Publications in Humanistic Studies. Online version at the Topos Text Project.
 Gaius Julius Hyginus, Astronomica from The Myths of Hyginus translated and edited by Mary Grant. University of Kansas Publications in Humanistic Studies. Online version at the Topos Text Project.
Homer, The Odyssey with an English Translation by A.T. Murray, PH.D. in two volumes. Cambridge, MA., Harvard University Press; London, William Heinemann, Ltd. 1919. Online version at the Perseus Digital Library. Greek text available from the same website.
 Parthenius, Love Romances translated by Sir Stephen Gaselee (1882-1943), S. Loeb Classical Library Volume 69. Cambridge, MA. Harvard University Press. 1916.  Online version at the Topos Text Project.
 Parthenius, Erotici Scriptores Graeci, Vol. 1. Rudolf Hercher. in aedibus B. G. Teubneri. Leipzig. 1858. Greek text available at the Perseus Digital Library.
 Pausanias, Description of Greece with an English Translation by W.H.S. Jones, Litt.D., and H.A. Ormerod, M.A., in 4 Volumes. Cambridge, MA, Harvard University Press; London, William Heinemann Ltd. 1918. . Online version at the Perseus Digital Library
Pausanias, Graeciae Descriptio. 3 vols. Leipzig, Teubner. 1903.  Greek text available at the Perseus Digital Library.
Publius Ovidius Naso, Metamorphoses translated by Brookes More (1859-1942). Boston, Cornhill Publishing Co. 1922. Online version at the Perseus Digital Library.
Publius Ovidius Naso, Metamorphoses. Hugo Magnus. Gotha (Germany). Friedr. Andr. Perthes. 1892. Latin text available at the Perseus Digital Library.

Princesses in Greek mythology
Family of Canace
Mortal parents of demigods in classical mythology
Thessalian characters in Greek mythology
Characters in the Odyssey

Thessalian mythology
Hecate
Incest in Greek mythology